Mittelweser is a Samtgemeinde ("collective municipality") in the district of Nienburg, in Lower Saxony, Germany. Its seat is in the village Stolzenau. It was formed on 1 November 2011 when the municipality Stolzenau joined the former Samtgemeinde Landesbergen.

The Samtgemeinde Mittelweser consists of the following municipalities:

 Estorf 
 Husum 
 Landesbergen
 Leese
 Stolzenau

Samtgemeinden in Lower Saxony
Nienburg (district)